In complex analysis, the Phragmén–Lindelöf principle (or method), first formulated by Lars Edvard Phragmén (1863–1937) and Ernst Leonard Lindelöf (1870–1946) in 1908, is a technique which employs an auxiliary, parameterized function to prove the boundedness of a holomorphic function  (i.e) on an unbounded domain  when an additional (usually mild) condition constraining the growth of  on  is given.  It is a generalization of the maximum modulus principle, which is only applicable to bounded domains.

Background

In the theory of complex functions, it is known that the modulus (absolute value) of a holomorphic (complex differentiable) function in the interior of a bounded region is bounded by its modulus on the boundary of the region. More precisely, if a non-constant function  is holomorphic in a bounded region  and continuous on its closure , then  for all . This is known as the maximum modulus principle. The maximum modulus principle is generally used to conclude that a holomorphic function is bounded in a region after showing that it is bounded on its boundary.

However, the maximum modulus principle cannot be applied to an unbounded region of the complex plane.  As a concrete example, let us examine the behavior of the holomorphic function  in the unbounded strip

.

Although , so that  is bounded on boundary ,  grows rapidly without bound when  along the positive real axis. The difficulty here stems from the extremely fast growth of  along the positive real axis.

Outline of the technique 

In the literature of complex analysis, there are many examples of the Phragmén–Lindelöf principle applied to unbounded regions of differing types, and also a version of this principle may be applied in a similar fashion to subharmonic and superharmonic functions.

Example of application 
To continue the example above, we can impose a growth condition on a holomorphic function  that prevents it from "blowing up" and allows the Phragmén–Lindelöf principle to be applied.   To this end, we now include the condition that 

It can then be shown that  for all  implies that  in fact holds for all . Thus, we have the following proposition:

Proposition. Let 

Then  for all .

Note that this conclusion fails when , precisely as the motivating counterexample in the previous section demonstrates.  The proof of this statement employs a typical Phragmén–Lindelöf argument:

Moreover, for a given , we define  to be the open rectangle in the complex plane enclosed within the vertices . Now, fix  and consider the function . Q.E.D.

Phragmén–Lindelöf principle for a sector in the complex plane 
A particularly useful statement proved using the Phragmén–Lindelöf principle bounds holomorphic functions on a sector of the complex plane if it is bounded on its boundary.  This statement can be used to give a complex analytic proof of the Hardy's uncertainty principle, which states that a function and its Fourier transform cannot both decay faster than exponentially. 

Proposition.  Let  be a function that is holomorphic in a sector

of central angle , and continuous on its boundary. If

Remarks
The condition can be relaxed to

with the same conclusion.

Special cases 
In practice the point 0 is often transformed into the point ∞ of the Riemann sphere. This gives a version of the principle that applies to strips, for example bounded by two lines of constant real part in the complex plane. This special case is sometimes known as Lindelöf's theorem.

Carlson's theorem is an application of the principle to functions bounded on the imaginary axis.

References

 
  (Corr. )
  (See chapter 5)
 
 

Mathematical principles
Theorems in complex analysis